Genesis High School is a secondary alternative school located in Bastrop, Texas, in the Bastrop Independent School District. The school serves all of BISD, including the cities of Bastrop, Cedar Creek, Red Rock, Rockne, Paige and other rural areas of Bastrop County. In 2015, the school was rated "Met Alternative Standard" by the Texas Education Agency.

Genesis High School is an alternative school and does not have school team sports; however, it does offer physical education, also known as PE.

References

External links
Official Website

Schools in Bastrop County, Texas
Public high schools in Texas
Alternative schools in the United States